Photinus dimissus is a species of firefly in the family Lampyridae. It is found in North America.

References

 Lloyd, James E. (1968). "A New Photinus Firefly, with Notes on Mating Behavior and a Possible Case of Character Displacement (Coleoptera: Lampyridae)". The Coleopterists Bulletin, vol. 22, no. 1, 1–10.
 McDermott, F. A. / Steel, W. O., ed. (1966). "Lampyridae". Coleopterorum Catalogus Supplementa, pars 9, 149.

Further reading

 Arnett, R.H. Jr., M. C. Thomas, P. E. Skelley and J. H. Frank. (eds.). (2002). American Beetles, Volume II: Polyphaga: Scarabaeoidea through Curculionoidea. CRC Press LLC, Boca Raton, FL.
 Arnett, Ross H. (2000). American Insects: A Handbook of the Insects of America North of Mexico. CRC Press.
 Richard E. White. (1983). Peterson Field Guides: Beetles. Houghton Mifflin Company.

Lampyridae
Bioluminescent insects